William Leslie Johnson (born November 10, 1954) is an American businessman and politician who has been the U.S. representative for  since 2011. He is a member of the Republican Party.

Early life, education, and business career

Born in Roseboro, North Carolina in 1954, Johnson grew up on family farms.  He entered the United States Air Force in 1973, and married Wanda Florence Porter on April 30, 1975. They had three children. He retired as a Lieutenant Colonel after a military career of more than 26 years. He graduated summa cum laude from Troy University in 1979, and he earned his master's degree from Georgia Tech in 1984. During his tenure in the U.S. Air Force, Johnson was recognized as a Distinguished Graduate from the Air Force Reserve Officer Training Corps, Squadron Officers School, and Air Command & Staff College.

Johnson has received the Air Force Meritorious Service Medal, the Air Force Commendation Medal, and the National Defense Service Medal. As Director of the Air Force's Chief Information Officer Staff at U.S. Special Operations Command, he worked directly with senior congressional and Secretary of Defense representatives, as well as top leaders of the various U.S. intelligence communities, to ensure America's Special Operations forces were adequately equipped to carry out critical national security missions.

He co-founded Johnson-Schley Management Group, an information technology (IT) consulting company that increased revenues by more than 200% in three years under his leadership. In 2003, he left the company to form J2 Business Solutions, where he provided executive-level IT support as a defense contractor to the U.S. military. From 2006 to 2010, he served as chief information officer of a global manufacturer of electronic components for the transportation industry.

U.S. House of Representatives

Elections
2010

In May 2010, Johnson defeated two primary opponents to win the Republican nomination. In the general election, he defeated incumbent Charlie Wilson, 50%–45%. He began his term in the 112th United States Congress on January 3, 2011.

2012

In November 2011, Wilson filed for a rematch in the newly redrawn 6th District, which had been made slightly friendlier to Republicans in redistricting. Johnson defeated Wilson again in a heavily contested race, 53% to 47%, and began his second term in January 2013.

2014

In 2014, Johnson faced Democratic nominee Jennifer Garrison, a former State Representative and lawyer from Marietta, Ohio. Johnson defeated Garrison, 58% to 39%, with Green Party candidate Dennis Lambert taking 3%. He began his third term in January 2015.

2016

Johnson was reelected to a fourth term in the 2016 general election, defeating Democrat Michael Lorentz, the mayor of Belpre, Ohio, 71%-29%.

2018

Johnson was reelected to a fifth term, defeating Democrat Shawna Roberts, of Barnesville, Ohio, 69%-30%.

Tenure
On January 7, 2021, Johnson objected to the certification of the 2020 U.S. presidential election results in Congress.

The House passed Johnson's World War II Memorial Prayer Act, which would require the prayer President Franklin Roosevelt gave on D-Day to be placed on the World War II memorial.

The House also passed Johnson's Stop the War on Coal Act, which would stop the creation of any new rules that threaten mining jobs. Both pieces of legislation have been sent to the Senate for consideration. Johnson sponsored H.R. 4036, the Pass a Budget Now Act, which would cut legislators' pay if a budget is not passed by April 15 of each year.

Committee assignments
 Committee on Energy and Commerce
 Subcommittee on Commerce, Manufacturing, and Trade
 Subcommittee on Environment and Economy
 Subcommittee on Oversight and Investigations
 Committee on Science, Space and Technology
 Subcommittee on Space

Caucus memberships
 Congressional Arts Caucus
Congressional Western Caucus
Republican Study Committee
Republican Main Street Partnership
Republican Governance Group
Problem Solvers Caucus

Legislation sponsored
 Community Fire Safety Act of 2013 (H.R. 3588; 113th Congress) – Johnson introduced this bill into the House on November 21, 2013. The bill would prevent the Environmental Protection Agency from requiring that all new fire hydrants in the United States be lead-free beginning in 2014.

Johnson called the EPA's ruling "absurd" and said that "it is unconscionable that the EPA has put our public safety at risk because during the hot summer months sometimes, somewhere kids may play in fire hydrant water."
 Preventing Government Waste and Protecting Coal Mining Jobs in America (H.R. 2824; 113th Congress) – Johnson introduced this bill into the House on July 25, 2013. If passed, the bill would have amended the Surface Mining Control and Reclamation Act of 1977 to require state programs for regulation of surface coal mining to incorporate the necessary rule concerning excess spoil, coal mine waste, and buffers for perennial and intermittent streams published by the Office of Surface Mining Reclamation and Enforcement on December 12, 2008. Supporters of the bill argued that it would be good for jobs, save the government money, and improve U.S. energy production by preventing the Obama administration from introducing more coal regulations. Opponents described it as a bill that would require "OSM to implement the flawed 2008 Stream Buffer Zone rule and prevent the agency from improving that rule for a minimum of seven years."
 Improving Trauma Care Act of 2014 (H.R. 3548; 113th Congress) – Johnson introduced this bill into the House on November 20, 2013. It would amend the Public Health Service Act, with respect to trauma care and research programs, to include in the definition of "trauma" an injury resulting from extrinsic agents other than mechanical force, including those that are thermal, electrical, chemical, or radioactive.

Political positions

During the presidency of Donald Trump, Johnson voted in line with Trump's stated position 96.8% of the time. As of September 2021, Johnson had voted in line with President Joe Biden's stated position 13.9% of the time.

Race relations
As protesters called for the removal of statues deemed racist, Johnson authored an opinion piece for the Washington Examiner titled "Our History Can Safeguard our Future". In his piece, Johnson opposed the toppling of statues, writing, "To really unify our country, we must pause and consider our history to provide context for our current national dialogue. We need to step out from behind our keyboards and learn more of the nuance of our shared heritage."

Abortion
In a candidates' questionnaire in 2010, Johnson wrote, "I am pro-life, and I oppose abortion except in the case of rape, incest, and when the mother's life is in danger. Additionally, I support parental notification and a ban on partial birth abortions." During his 2010 and 2012 campaigns, Johnson was endorsed by the Ohio Right to Life PAC.

Environmental issues
At a 2016 House Energy and Commerce Committee hearing on Environmental Protection Agency regulations, Johnson called the agency "un-American" and accused it of "draining the lifeblood out of our businesses." His remarks prompted criticism from Democratic members of the committee.

Johnson was briefly criticized on an episode of Last Week Tonight with John Oliver for asking a Department of Energy representative about the financial return on investment regarding the Clean Future Act, which host John Oliver compared to asking about the financial return on investment of a fire department.

Gun issues
A lifelong member of the National Rifle Association, Johnson opposes further restrictions on gun ownership. The NRA endorsed him in 2012.

Health care
Johnson opposes the Patient Protection and Affordable Care Act and supports repealing it.

Immigration and refugees
From the beginning, Johnson supported President Donald Trump's 2017 executive order to impose a temporary ban on entry to the U.S. to citizens of seven Muslim-majority countries, characterizing it as necessary to prevent terrorist attacks. After the federal courts struck down the initial executive order, Johnson supported a replacement executive order imposing a revised travel ban.

Same-sex marriage
Johnson opposes the legalization of same-sex marriage, saying that it "undermines the integrity of the American family."

Trump administration

On December 18, 2019, Johnson held a moment of silence to remember Trump voters during House debates on articles of impeachment, saying, "This is a sad day for America. This partisan impeachment sham seeks to disenfranchise 63 million American voters... So I want to use my time to call on this chamber, for members to rise and observe a moment of silent reflection, to give every member here the chance to pause for a moment and remember the voices of the 63 million American voters the Democrats today are wanting to silence."

In April 2018, Johnson defended EPA head Scott Pruitt, who was embroiled in a number of investigations over ethics violations. While Pruitt was being grilled, largely along party lines, during an April 2018 hearing about the ethics concerns, Johnson said, "I think it's shameful today that this hearing has turned into a personal attack hearing and a shameful attempt to denigrate the work that's being done at the EPA and with this administration". Public officials should have ethical standards "beyond reproach ... but so should members of Congress", he added.

In December 2020, Johnson was one of 126 Republican members of the House of Representatives to sign an amicus brief in support of Texas v. Pennsylvania, a lawsuit filed at the United States Supreme Court contesting the results of the 2020 presidential election, in which Joe Biden defeated Trump. The Supreme Court declined to hear the case on the basis that Texas lacked standing under Article III of the Constitution to challenge the results of an election held by another state.

Electoral history

References

External links
Congressman Bill Johnson official U.S. House website
Bill Johnson campaign website
 
 
 

|-

1954 births
21st-century American politicians
Chief information officers
Living people
Military personnel from North Carolina
Military personnel from Ohio
People from Mahoning County, Ohio
People from Roseboro, North Carolina
Troy University alumni
United States Air Force officers
Republican Party members of the United States House of Representatives from Ohio